Diceroprocta texana is a species of cicada in the family Cicadidae. It is found in Central America and North America.

References

Further reading

 
 

Articles created by Qbugbot
Insects described in 1916
Diceroprocta